Nancy Mitchell Pfotenhauer (born 1963 as Nancy Wadley) is the president of MediaSpeak Strategies. She has been a Senior Policy Advisor and National Spokesperson with the 2008 John McCain presidential campaign and political commentator on Fox News, CNN and MSNBC. She was also former Executive Vice President of Citizens for a Sound Economy (CSE), former President of the Independent Women's Forum, and former President of Americans for Prosperity (originally CSE).

Early career
She started her career as graduate research assistant to Walter E. Williams at George Mason University, where she was taking an MA in economics. At George Mason, Pfotenhauer studied under economist Walter Williams. After graduating from George Mason University, Pfotenhauer became chief economist at the Republican National Committee (1988). She worked for George H. W. Bush's transition team (1988) and then (until 1990) for Sen. William L. Armstrong (R-CO); in 1990 she was appointed chief economist of the President's Council on Competitiveness.

Citizens for a Sound Economy
In 1995 Pfotenhauer joined Citizens for a Sound Economy as Executive Vice President for Policy. With her then-husband Daniel J. Mitchell, an economist at The Heritage Foundation, she co-hosted the call-in show Mitchells in the Morning on National Empowerment Television, run by Heritage Foundation founder Paul Weyrich.

Koch Industries (1996–2001)
From 1996 to 2001, she served as Director of the Washington office for Koch Industries (KII). She built and managed the DC team's lobbying operation, PAC and all legislative and regulatory strategies in addition to jointly running KII's government affairs operations globally. The largest privately held company in the country, KII's interests fell heavily in the energy, environment, transportation and tax fields. She ran multimillion-dollar issue campaigns at the federal and state level.

While working for Koch, she married Gordon Smith's (R-OR) chief of staff Kurt Pfotenhauer, who works as a mortgage-industry lobbyist.

Recent career

She is the former President and CEO of the Independent Women's Forum (IWF) (2000–2005). She was Vice Chairman of IWF's Board of Directors from 2005 to 2007. In 2002, Pfotenhauer was nominated by President George W. Bush to serve as a delegate to the United Nations' Commission on the Status of Women and served during the 46th session of the Commission. The Bush Administration also appointed her to the National Advisory Committee on Violence Against Women. Additionally, she served on advisory committees reporting directly to Secretary of Labor Elaine Chao and former Secretary of Energy Spencer Abraham.

From 2003 to 2007, Pfotenhauer led Americans for Prosperity, an American conservative political advocacy group.

She was an advisor for the 2008 John McCain presidential campaign. During the campaign she sparked controversy by referring to areas of Virginia outside of Northern Virginia as "real Virginia", picking up on a GOP talking point that Sarah Palin promoted, namely that red states are the "real America" and more "pro-America".

In 2011, Pfotenhauer appeared as a spokeswoman for Koch Industries on FoxNews and other media outlets.

In 2013, Pfotenhauer was a signatory to an amicus curiae brief submitted to the Supreme Court in support of same-sex marriage during the Hollingsworth v. Perry case.

References

External links
 

Living people
21st-century American economists
American women economists
George Mason University alumni
1963 births